Edson Diego Aubert Cervantes (born 24 November 1988 in Arequipa) is a Peruvian footballer who plays as an attacking midfielder for Binacional in the Peruvian Primera División.

Club career

Early career
Aubert made his league debut in the Torneo Descentralizado in the 2005 season playing for his local club Atlético Universidad, at the age of 16. However, his club was relegated at the end of the season.  In 2006, he joined Club IDUNSA (Instituto del Deporte Universitario de la Universidad Nacional de San Agustín), which was also based in Arequipa. There he played in the 2006 Copa Perú season. In the 2007 Copa Perú season his club managed to reach the semifinal stage but were then eliminated by Sport Águila. Then in 2008 he joined Puno based club Diablos Rojos de Juliaca. There he played in the 2008 Copa Perú season and helped his club reach the Round of 16. There his club met his former side Club IDUNSA and lost 2–1 on aggregate.

FBC Melgar
In January 2009 Aubert returned to his hometown and joined Arequipa giants FBC Melgar for the start of the 2009 Torneo Descentralizado season. After three years, Aubert returned to the Descentralizado and made his debut that season with Melgar in Round 14 against Coronel Bolognesi. Playing at home in the Mariano Melgar Stadium, Aubert managed to play the entire match and help his side win 2–1.

Alianza Lima
On 15 December 2011 it was reported that Aubert joined Peruvian giants Alianza Lima for the start of the 2012 season.

References

External links

1988 births
Living people
People from Arequipa
Association football midfielders
Peruvian footballers
Atlético Universidad footballers
FBC Melgar footballers
Club Alianza Lima footballers
Real Garcilaso footballers
Peruvian Primera División players
Copa Perú players
Deportivo Binacional FC players